In mathematical optimization, Lemke's algorithm is a procedure for solving linear complementarity problems, and more generally mixed linear complementarity problems. It is named after Carlton E. Lemke.

Lemke's algorithm is of pivoting or basis-exchange type. Similar algorithms can compute Nash equilibria for two-person matrix and bimatrix games.

References 
 
  (Available for download at the website of Professor Katta G. Murty.)

External links
 OMatrix manual on Lemke
 Chris Hecker's GDC presentation on MLCPs and Lemke
 Linear Complementarity and Mathematical (Non-linear) Programming
 Siconos/Numerics open-source GPL  implementation in C of Lemke's algorithm and other methods to solve LCPs and MLCPs

Optimization algorithms and methods